Nicolae Coval Cabinet was the Cabinet of Moldova (19 April 1945 - 5 January 1946).

Membership of the Cabinet  

 Nicolae Coval, Prime Minister of Moldova, (19 April 1945 - 5 January 1946) 
 Gherasim Rudi, Minister of Foreign Affairs, (19 April 1945 - 5 January 1946) 
 Major General Mihail Markeev, Minister of Internal Affairs (19 April 1945 - 5 January 1946) 
 General Iosif Mordoveţ, Minister of National Security (19 April 1945 - 5 January 1946)

Bibliography 
 *** - Enciclopedia sovietică moldovenească (Chişinău, 1970-1977)

 

 

Moldova cabinets
1945 establishments in the Moldavian Soviet Socialist Republic
1946 disestablishments in the Moldavian Soviet Socialist Republic
Cabinets established in 1945
Cabinets disestablished in 1946